Anton Holban (10 February 1902, in Huşi – 15 January 1937, in Bucharest) was a Romanian novelist. He was the nephew of Eugen Lovinescu.

The son of Gheorghe Holban (whom had from his father’s side Germanic ancestry) and Antoaneta Lovinescu, he was a writer, French teacher and theoretician of the novel. He first read fragments of his novels at his uncle's literary club - Sburătorul, and this is considered to be his debut.

Major works

Novels
 Romanul lui Mirel, 1929
 O moarte care nu dovedeşte nimic, 1931
 Parada dascălilor, 1932
 Ioana, 1934
 Jocurile Daniei (posthumous publication in 1971)

External links
 The official website of the Lovinescu Family

1902 births
1937 deaths
Romanian male novelists
People from Huși
20th-century Romanian novelists
20th-century Romanian male writers